Fagerholm is a Swedish-language surname, more common in Finland than in Sweden.

Geographical distribution
As of 2014, 62.7% of all known bearers of the surname Fagerholm were residents of Finland (frequency 1:7,129), 23.5% of Sweden (1:34,072), 9.5% of the United States (1:3,087,618) and 2.5% of Norway (1:165,882).

In Finland, the frequency of the surname was higher than national average (1:7,129) in the following regions:
 1. Åland (1:547)
 2. Ostrobothnia (1:934)
 3. Southwest Finland (1:4,896)
 4. Uusimaa (1:4,969)
 5. Central Ostrobothnia (1:5,573)

In Sweden, the frequency of the surname was higher than national average (1:34,072) in the following counties:
 1. Halland County (1:11,761)
 2. Södermanland County (1:17,451)
 3. Stockholm County (1:19,341)
 4. Kalmar County (1:23,637)
 5. Kronoberg County (1:27,340)
 6. Värmland County (1:30,826)
 7. Västmanland County (1:32,422)

People
 Karl-August Fagerholm (1901–1984), Finnish politician
 Anneli Aarika-Szrok (born 1924), née Fagerholm, Finnish opera singer
 Monika Fagerholm (born 1961), Finnish author
 Michael Monroe (born 1962), real name Matti Antero Kristian Fagerholm, Finnish rock musician
 Ardis Fagerholm (born 1971), Swedish pop singer
 Samuel Fagerholm (born 1992), Finnish football manager and former footballer

References

Swedish-language surnames